Luna is the name given in October 1997 to a 1,000-year-old,  coast redwood tree located near the community of Stafford in Humboldt County, California which was occupied for 738 days by forest activist Julia Butterfly Hill and saved by an agreement between Hill and the Pacific Lumber Company.  The tree was vandalized about a year after the agreement but was repaired and survived.

The coast redwood species is monoecious, with pollen and seed cones on the same plant.

Location
Luna is located on a windswept ridge overlooking the community of Stafford, south of Scotia.  Due to its proximity to the small community of Stafford, this tree has also been referred to as the "Stafford Giant".  

Despite some news reports to the contrary, Luna is not located in the Headwaters Forest Reserve, a preserved old growth forest.

History
The 1,000-year-old lightning-struck tree was named by a group of Earth First! members, who built a small platform from salvaged wood to serve as a tree-sit platform.  As the moon was rising at the time, they chose the name Luna, the Latin word for moon, to commemorate the event.

Hill occupied Luna in order to save it and the surrounding grove from being clear-cut by the Pacific Lumber Company (owned by Maxxam, Inc. and Charles Hurwitz). The Pacific Lumber Company and Hill reached an agreement to save the tree and a  buffer zone around it for $50,000 after which Hill left the tree. Later she wrote a book called The Legacy of Luna about her experiences treesitting in the giant redwood. Some of her predictions came true, as Maxxam, Inc. failed in bankruptcy after cutting a 100-year timber reserve in 20 years, leaving employees and suppliers in the lurch.

In November 2000, an unknown vandal used a chainsaw to cut halfway through the tree. They were assisted by Humboldt State University professor Steven Sillett.

In early 2002, naturalist Paul Donahue noted that Luna had survived the cut. Luna is currently under the stewardship of Sanctuary Forest, a Nonprofit Organization.

See also
The Legacy of Luna, Hill's 2000 memoirs about her efforts to save the tree
Butterfly, a 2000 documentary film about Hill's campaign
 List of individual trees

References

External links

 Ficklin, James and Penelope Andrews LUNA The Stafford Giant Tree Sit

Individual coast redwood trees
History of Humboldt County, California
Nonviolent occupation
Julia Butterfly Hill
Pacific Lumber Company